Sophia is a British indie rock band consisting of Robin Proper-Sheppard—former member of The God Machine—and the Sophia collective, a group of musicians who collaborate with Sophia. "Oh My Love" from the album People are like Seasons became an indie hit in several countries.

History 
After the release of the final The God Machine album, in 1995, Proper-Sheppard set up the Flower Shop label, putting out records from the likes of Elevate, Ligament, and Swervedriver. He also began recording a year later as Sophia. Sophia sounded nothing like The God Machine. Instead of ear-busting and grating, they were low-key and introspective. With the help from other Flower Shop artists—Graham Miles (Elevate), Dan Mulligan (Oil Seed Rape) and James Elkington (Elevate)—he recorded 1996's Fixed Water featuring the single "Are You Happy Now". 

Two years later, The Infinite Circle followed. In 2005, this album was performed live in its entirety as part of the All Tomorrow's Parties-curated Don't Look Back series. 

In 2001, Sophia released a live album De Nachten. The album was recorded during two festival appearances in Belgium and the Netherlands and had four new songs and a cover of the John Lennon song "Jealous Guy". 

In January 2004, Sophia released their third studio album People Are Like Seasons. The album was released by City Slang/EMI and was the first Sophia release for a major label. The album had chart success in several European countries (highest entry was number 8 in Belgium). The band — of which the main members are now Robin Proper-Sheppard (vocals, guitar), Jeff Townsin (drums), Will Foster (keyboards) and ex-Swervedriver mainman Adam Franklin (guitar) — toured Europe in 2004. 

In 2004, a rarities CD was released called Collections:One. 

The fourth studio album Technology Won't Save Us was released in October 2006.

In 2009, the album There Are No Goodbyes was released.

During 2010, Proper-Sheppard did a solo acoustic tour called 'At Home with Sophia...'. The idea was to create an atmosphere that was as intimate as a living room, for people to come and hear the songs of Sophia much as they were originally written.

In 2016, the album As We Make Our Way (Unknown Harbours) was released.

In 2017, the album As We Make Our Way – The Live Recordings was released. It was recorded during the tour that supported the As We Make Our Way (Unknown Harbours) album.

In September 2020, Sophia released the album Holding On / Letting Go, following the release of three singles from the album earlier in the year.

Discography
Albums
 Fixed Water (1996, The Flower Shop Recordings)
 The Infinite Circle (1998, The Flower Shop Recordings)
 De Nachten (2001, Flower Shop Recordings)
 People are like Seasons (2004, The Flower Shop Recordings/City Slang/Bang!)
 Collections:One (2004, Flower Shop Recordings)
 Technology Won't Save Us (2006, The Flower Shop Recordings/City Slang/Bang!)
 There Are No Goodbyes (2009, The Flower Shop Recordings/City Slang/Bang!)
 As We Make Our Way (Unknown Harbours) (2016, The Flower Shop Recordings/[PIAS]/Motor Music)
 As We Make Our Way – The Live Recordings (2017, The Flower Shop Recordings/[PIAS]/Motor Music)
 Holding On / Letting Go (2020, The Flower Shop Recordings)

Singles
 "So Slow" (4 track version) (Split 7" single with Swervedriver) (1996, Echostatic/Space Baby)
 "Are You Happy Now" (1997, The Flower Shop Recordings)
 "Desert Song No. 2" (Free 10" tour single) (2003, The Flower Shop Recordings)
 "Oh My Love" (2004, City Slang/Labels/Virgin/The Flower Shop Recordings)
 "Holidays Are Nice" (new version, promo only) (2004, City Slang/Labels/Virgin/The Flower Shop Recordings)
 "Pace" (promo only) (2006, City Slang/The Flower Shop Recordings)
 "Where Are You now" (promo only) (2007, City Slang/The Flower Shop Recordings)
 "There Are No Goodbyes" (2009, City Slang/The Flower Shop Recordings/Bang!)
 "Alive" (2020, The Flower Shop Recordings)
 "We See You (Taking Aim)" (2020, The Flower Shop Recordings)
 "Undone. Again." (2020, The Flower Shop Recordings)

External links
 The official unofficial Sophia site 'Sophiamusic.net'

British indie rock groups
Sadcore and slowcore groups
City Slang artists